In statistical process control (SPC), the  and R chart is a type of scheme, popularly known as control chart,  used to monitor the mean and range of a normally distributed variables simultaneously, when samples are collected at regular intervals from a business or industrial process.

Properties 
The  and R chart plots the mean value for the quality characteristic across all units in the sample, plus the range of the quality characteristic across all units in the sample as follows:

 R = xmax - xmin.

The normal distribution is the basis for the charts and requires the following assumptions:

 The quality characteristic to be monitored is adequately modeled by a normally distributed random variable
 The parameters μ and σ for the random variable are the same for each unit and each unit is independent of its predecessors or successors
 The inspection procedure is same for each sample and is carried out consistently from sample to sample

The control limits for this chart type are:

  for monitoring the process mean

The anti-biasing constants are typically found in the appendices of textbooks on statistical process control.

Usage of the chart 
The chart is advantageous in the following situations:
 The sample size is relatively small (say, n ≤ 10— and s charts are typically used for larger sample sizes)
 The sample size is constant
 Humans must perform the calculations for the chart

Thus, the R chart is examined before the  chart; if the R chart indicates the sample variability is in statistical control, then the  chart is examined to determine if the sample mean is also in statistical control. If on the other hand, the sample variability is not in statistical control, then the entire process is judged to be not in statistical control regardless of what the  chart indicates.

Limitations 

See also
  and s chart
Shewhart individuals control chart
Simultaneous monitoring of mean and variance of Gaussian Processes with estimated parameters (when standards are unknown)

References

Quality control tools
Statistical charts and diagrams